
Gmina Brzozów is an urban-rural gmina (administrative district) in Brzozów County, Subcarpathian Voivodeship, in south-eastern Poland.

Villages
Apart from the town of Brzozów, Gmina Brzozów contains the villages and settlements of Górki, Grabownica Starzeńska, Humniska, Stara Wieś, Turze Pole, Wola Górecka and Zmiennica, Przysietnica, Stara Wieś

Neighbouring gminas
Gmina Brzozów is bordered by the gminas of Domaradz, Dydnia, Haczów, Jasienica Rosielna, Nozdrzec, Sanok and Zarszyn.

References
Polish official population figures 2006

Brzozow
Brzozów County